Mohamed Saadaoui (born 11 May 1995) is a Tunisian freestyle wrestler. He competed in the 86 kg division at the 2016 Summer Olympics, but was eliminated in the first bout. He took up wrestling in 2005.

He qualified at the 2021 African & Oceania Wrestling Olympic Qualification Tournament to represent Tunisia at the 2020 Summer Olympics in Tokyo, Japan.

He won the bronze medal in the 97 kg event at the 2022 Mediterranean Games held in Oran, Algeria.

References

External links
 

Olympic wrestlers of Tunisia
1995 births
Wrestlers at the 2016 Summer Olympics
Living people
African Games silver medalists for Tunisia
African Games medalists in wrestling
Competitors at the 2015 African Games
African Wrestling Championships medalists
Wrestlers at the 2020 Summer Olympics
Mediterranean Games bronze medalists for Tunisia
Mediterranean Games medalists in wrestling
Competitors at the 2022 Mediterranean Games
21st-century Tunisian people
Tunisian male sport wrestlers